Energy in Europe includes energy and electricity production, consumption and import in Europe.

Primary energy consumption by country 

Primary energy consumption for selected European and Eurasian countries in million tonnes of oil equivalent (Mtoe) from 2010 to 2015, according to BP, is listed below.

Primary energy consumption per capita (2008) 

The European primary energy use per capita (TWh per million people) in 2008 is listed below.

Mtoe = 11.63 TWh primary energy, includes energy losses

Oil 

Oil is one of the largest primary energy sources in Europe. It is mostly used for transportation and heating.
Oil production is relatively low in Europe, with significant production only in the North Sea. Most of Europe's oil comes from imports (about 90% for the EU28).

Electricity

Renewable energy 
The twelve newer EU Member States in Central and Eastern Europe plan to increase wind power capacity from the 6.4 gigawatts installed at the end of 2012 to 16 gigawatts by 2020.

If renewable electricity production in the EU continued to grow at the same rate as it did from 2005 to 2010, it would account for 36.4% of electricity in 2020 and 51.6% in 2030, following:

In March 2022, the European Commission released its comprehensive "REPowerEU" plan to promote renewable energy in Europe.

Generation and consumption

See also 
 Electricity in Europe
 Energy policy of the European Union
 Energy efficiency in Europe (study)
 European countries by fossil fuel use (% of total energy)
 European countries by electricity consumption per person

References